Allá En El Sur ("Back in the South") is the second studio album released by Colombian singer-songwriter Ilona on February 12, 2008. The album received a nomination for a Latin Grammy Award for Best Female Pop Vocal Album at the 8th Latin Grammy Awards, losing to Yo Canto by Italian performer Laura Pausini.

Track listing
The track listing from Allmusic.

References

2008 albums
Rock en Español albums
Ilona (singer) albums